Robbie Gallagher (born 19 February 1968) is an Irish Fianna Fáil politician who has served as a Senator for the Labour Panel since April 2016.

A former Garda and estate agent, he is from Termon and was a member of Monaghan County Council from 2004 to 2016.

He is the Fianna Fáil Seanad spokesperson on Education. He was an unsuccessful candidate for Cavan–Monaghan at the 2002 and 2020 general elections. He was re-elected to the Seanad in 2020.

References

External links

Robbie Gallagher's page on the Fianna Fáil website

1968 births
Living people
Fianna Fáil senators
Members of the 25th Seanad
Members of the 26th Seanad
Local councillors in County Monaghan
Alumni of Cork Institute of Technology
Garda Síochána officers
Alumni of Garda Síochána College